Hans Clarin (14 September 1929 – 28 August 2005) was a German actor. He became a well-known voice actor of characters in children audio plays, particularly the kobold Pumuckl (including its TV and cinematic film adaptations), the German voice of René Goscinny and Albert Uderzo's diminutive Gaulish hero Asterix (in circa 30 German audioplay adaptations of the Asterix comic books, produced and published 1986-1992 under the Europa label), and the ghost Hui Buh.

Biography
Clarin was born Hans-Joachim Schmid in Wilhelmshaven, and grew up in Frankfurt am Main. After graduation he studied acting in Munich from 1948 to 1950. He made his début appearance in 1950 in Franz Grillparzer's play Weh dem, der lügt ("Woe to him who lies"). From 1952 until 1967 he was employed by the Bavarian State Theatre in Munich, where he appeared in plays such as A Midsummer Night's Dream, Leonce and Lena, Woyzeck and The Blue Angel, and gained a reputation as a character actor who excelled in both comic and dramatic roles, as well as musicals and opera.

He made his first appearance on film in 1952, playing the title role in Zwerg Nase, based on a fairy tale by Wilhelm Hauff. He went on to appear in over 100 television and feature films, including The Haunted Castle (1960), The Indian Scarf (1963) and Pippi Longstocking (1969).

On television, he gained popularity through roles in the series Weißblaue Geschichten (1985), Fest im Sattel (1988), Rivalen der Rennbahn (1989), Peter und Paul (1992), Titus, der Satansbraten (1997), as well as making appearances in the long running crime series Ein Fall für zwei, Der Alte and Tatort. Between 1995 and 2000 he appeared in five productions by the Chiemgauer Volkstheater.

Clarin was also a voice artist, dubbing the voice for "Kookie" Kookson in the US series 77 Sunset Strip, and playing the title role in the children's audio series Hui Buh and Pumuckl.

On 28 August 2005 Clarin died aged 75, in his adopted hometown of Aschau im Chiemgau, of heart failure.

Awards and honours
Clarin was made a Bavarian Staatsschauspieler ("State Actor") in 1961, and was awarded the Federal Order of Merit in 1994 and the Bavarian Order of Merit in 1997. In May 2006 the Bahnhofsplatz in Aschau im Chiemgau was renamed Hans-Clarin-Platz in his honour.

Personal life
Clarin was married three times; first to Irene Reiter, with whom he had three daughters. With his second wife, Margarethe, Freiin von Cramer-Klett, he had a son Philip and a daughter Anne. In 1995 Clarin married his third wife Christa Maria, Gräfin von Hardenberg.

Selected filmography
 The Last Illusion (1949)
 Dear Miss Doctor (1954), as Cicero
 Fireworks (1954)
 Doctor Solm (1955), as Benvenuto Berding
 The Spessart Inn (1958), as Peter
 Arms and the Man (1958)
 The Beautiful Adventure (1959), as Polyte
 The Haunted Castle (1960), as Prince Kalaka
 Stage Fright (1960) as Himself
 Mediterranean Holiday (1962) – Narrator
 Max the Pickpocket (1962), as Fred
 The Indian Scarf (1963), as Lord Edward Lebanon
 Waiting Room to the Beyond (1964), as Harry Mason
 Room 13 (1964)
 24 Hours to Kill (1965), as Elias
  (1968), as Count
 Pippi Longstocking (1969), as Dunder-Karlsson
  (1977), as Hairdresser
  (1979, TV film), as Waldo Meyer
  (1982), as Pumuckl (voice)
 Meister Eder und sein Pumuckl (1982–1999, TV series), as Pumuckl (voice)
 Mandara (1983, TV miniseries) as Lodders
 Hochwürden erbt das Paradies (1993, TV film), as Gustav
  (1994), as Pumuckl (voice)

Works
  (Autobiography)

References

External links
 
 Biografie of Hans Clarin 

1929 births
2005 deaths
People from Wilhelmshaven
German male film actors
German male television actors
German male voice actors
20th-century German male actors
21st-century German male actors
Officers Crosses of the Order of Merit of the Federal Republic of Germany